Kieran Thomas Murphy (born 21 December 1987) is an English professional footballer, who plays for Chertsey Town.

Previously at Milton Keynes Dons where he made his professional debut away to Brighton & Hove Albion, Murphy then got the chance to study at Loughborough University and stopped playing professional football. He joined Ilkeston Town F.C. before the start of the 2008–09 season and had a magnificent first year at the club, picking up two separate player of the year awards and is currently team captain. Murphy also currently plays for the first XI for the Loughborough Students Football Team in the Midland Football Combination. He played in the Universiade for Great Britain in 2011 and captained them in 2013.

References

External links

Kieran Murphy at Aylesbury United

1987 births
Living people
Footballers from Kingston upon Thames
English footballers
Alumni of Loughborough University
Republic of Ireland under-21 international footballers
Association football defenders
Milton Keynes Dons F.C. players
Ilkeston Town F.C. (1945) players
Maidenhead United F.C. players
Walton & Hersham F.C. players
Crawley Town F.C. players
Carshalton Athletic F.C. players
Kingstonian F.C. players
Hampton & Richmond Borough F.C. players
Aylesbury United F.C. players
Hemel Hempstead Town F.C. players
Chesham United F.C. players
Chertsey Town F.C. players
Northern Football League players
Southern Football League players
National League (English football) players
Isthmian League players
Universiade silver medalists for Great Britain
Universiade medalists in football
Medalists at the 2013 Summer Universiade